Valerie van Roon (born 13 August 1998) is a Dutch swimmer. She is a three-time European Champion and a three-time World silver medalist.

Career 
van Roon competed at the 2014 European Junior Championships where she won the bronze medal in the 50 m freestyle and in the mixed  freestyle.

She competed at the 2017 European Short Course Championships in the 4×50 m freestyle relay along with Ranomi Kromowidjojo, Femke Heemskerk, and Tamara van Vliet, and they won the gold medal and set the world record with a time of 1:33.91. She also competed in the heats of the 4×50 m mixed freestyle, and the Dutch team won the gold medal.

At the 2018 FINA World Championships, she competed in the women's 4 × 50 m freestyle with Ranomi Kromowidjojo, Femke Heemskerk, and Kim Busch, and they won the silver medal behind the United States. She also competed in the heats of the women's 4 × 100 metre freestyle with Busch, Kromowidjojo, and Maaike de Waard, and they finished second, but van Roon was switched out for Heemskerk in the finals, but van Roon still received a silver medal. Additionally, she competed in the heats of the mixed 4 × 50 metre freestyle relay with Jesse Puts, Stan Pijnenburg, and Busch, and they finished fifth. She did not compete in the final, but she still received the silver medal.

van Roon competed at the 2019 European Short Course Championships in the 4×50 m freestyle relay along with Tamara van Vliet, Kira Toussaint, and Femke Heemskerk, and they tied for the gold medal with the French relay team.

References 

1998 births
Living people
Dutch female freestyle swimmers
Medalists at the FINA World Swimming Championships (25 m)
European Aquatics Championships medalists in swimming
21st-century Dutch women